Bye Bye Birdie is a 1960 Broadway musical.

Bye Bye Birdie may also refer to:

Films
Bye Bye Birdie (1963 film), film based on the stage musical
Bye Bye Birdie (1995 film), television film based on the stage musical

Music
"Bye Bye Birdie", number from the musical by Strouse and Adams, recorded in 1963 by several artists: Ann-Margret, Bobby Rydell, Jimmie Haskell, Kay Barry, and Mie Nakao

Television
 "Bye, Bye Birdie" (Full House episode), an episode of the TV series Full House
 "Bye, Bye Birdie / Belch of Destiny", an episode of the TV series Rocko's Modern Life
 "Bye Bye Birdies / Call of the Wild", an episode of the TV series Wow! Wow! Wubbzy!

See also
 Birdie (disambiguation)
 "Bye Bye Bird", a 1963 song written by Willie Dixon and Sonny Boy Williamson II
 Bye Bye Byrd (1955-1980), United States Harness Racing Hall of fame pacer